Marc Émile Bouissou (6 April 1931 – 23 November 2018) was a French rower who competed in the 1952 Summer Olympics. In 1952 he was a crew member of the French boat which won the silver medal in the coxless four event.

References

1931 births
2018 deaths
French male rowers
Olympic rowers of France
Rowers at the 1952 Summer Olympics
Olympic silver medalists for France
Olympic medalists in rowing
Medalists at the 1952 Summer Olympics
European Rowing Championships medalists
20th-century French people